Die goldene Stadt, is a 1942 German color film directed by Veit Harlan, starring Kristina Söderbaum, who won the Volpi Cup for Best Actress.

Plot
Anna, a young, innocent country girl (a Sudeten German), whose mother drowned in the swamp, dreams of visiting the golden city of Prague. After she falls in love with a surveyor, she runs away from the countryside near České Budějovice to Prague to find him. She is instead seduced and later abandoned by her cousin (a Czech). She attempts to return home, but her father rejects her, so she drowns herself in the same swamp where her mother died.

Cast

Sources
The movie is based on drama Der Gigant by Austrian writer . In the novel, however, it is the heart-broken father who commits suicide; the Nazi Propaganda Ministry, in particular Joseph Goebbels, insisted that it be the daughter rather than the father who dies.

Motifs
Anna's fate and drowning are clearly represented as the natural consequence of her failure to appreciate the countryside and her longings for the city. This harmonizes with the preference for the countryside of the Blood and Soil doctrine.

Citations

References

External links
 

1941 drama films
1942 drama films
1941 films
1942 films
German black-and-white films
German drama films
1940s German-language films
Films directed by Veit Harlan
Films of Nazi Germany
Films set in Prague
Nazi propaganda films
UFA GmbH films
Films set in Czechoslovakia
1940s German films